Life Is Cool (rr: Geunyeoneun Yeppeotda; lit. "She Was Beautiful") is a 2008 South Korean romance animated film, and is the first rotoscoped film from that country. This film's visual style was influenced from Richard Linklater's two films, Waking Life (2001) and A Scanner Darkly (2006).

Plot 
Three tricenarian best friends — a heart-broken Romeo, a hopeless romantic, and a goofy playboy — meet for the first time in ten years. However, things get complicated when they all fall for the same woman.

Cast 
 Kim Su-ro ... Baek Il-kwon
 Kang Sung-jin ... Kim Tae-yeong
 Kim Jin-soo ... Seong-hoon
 Park Ye-jin ... Kang Yeon-woo
 Kim Roi-ha ... Basketball manager
 Lee Won ... Samsung scouter
 David Joseph Anselmo ... Foreign professor
 Goo Bon-im ... Barbershop woman
 Kim Choon-gi ... University adulterer
 Kim Ju-hyeon ... High school girl
 Yoon Joo-hee ... Joo-hee
 Jo Young-gyu ... Policeman
 Park Jin-taek ... Naked man
 Park Yoo-mil ... Pregnant woman
 Lee Sang-hong ... Tango gangster

Production 
Life Is Cool was one of four films produced by CJ Entertainment to receive investment from Keyeast, a media contents company co-established by actor Bae Yong-joon. Although actual shooting only lasted for one month, it then took almost two years and 140 artists to complete the rotoscoping, a technique in which animators traced over live action footage frame by frame. Visual effects were created by local production company DNA, who had previously worked on The Animatrix.

Director Choi Equan has said that he was inspired by the Richard Linklater's film Waking Life, and that the film's plot was based on a real-life story of one of his friends.

Release 
Life Is Cool was released in South Korea on 12 June 2008. The film accumulated a total of 3,951 admissions at the domestic box office, and grossed US$28,100.

References

External links 
 Life Is Cool at Naver
 
 
 Life Is Cool at AnimationInsider.net
 

South Korean animated films
2000s romance films
South Korean independent films
Films set in Seoul
Rotoscoped films
2000s Korean-language films
2000s South Korean films